Jonas Levänen (born 12 January 1994) is a Finnish professional footballer who plays for FC Honka, as a defender. He was part of the Veikkausliiga Team of the Month for August 2018 while playing for Honka.

References

1994 births
Living people
Finnish footballers
Pallohonka players
FC Honka players
Vaasan Palloseura players
Kakkonen players
Veikkausliiga players
Association football defenders
Footballers from Espoo